Madison Township is one of eleven townships in Montgomery County, Indiana, United States. As of the 2010 census, its population was 1,272 and it contained 531 housing units.

Geography

Cities, towns, villages
 Linden

Unincorporated towns
 Cherry Grove at 
 Kirkpatrick at

Major highways
  U.S. Route 231

Airports and landing strips
 Wilkins Strip Airport

Education
 North Montgomery Community School Corporation

Madison Township residents may obtain a free library card from the Linden Carnegie Public Library in Linden.

Political districts
 Indiana's 4th congressional district
 State House District 41
 State Senate District 23

References
 
 United States Census Bureau 2008 TIGER/Line Shapefiles
 IndianaMap

External links
 Indiana Township Association
 United Township Association of Indiana
 City-Data.com page for Madison Township

Townships in Montgomery County, Indiana
Townships in Indiana